John Inchbald Johnson (10 July 1871 – 20 October 1930) was an English cricketer who played for Northamptonshire. He was born in Aldwark Bridge and died in Culworth, Northamptonshire. The 1911 census records that, outside cricket, he was a surgeon.

He made a single first-class appearance, during the 1907 season, against Essex. From the tailend, he scored a duck in the first innings in which he batted, and didn't bat in the second innings. Northamptonshire drew the match.

He took one catch during the match.

External links
John Johnson at Cricket Archive

1871 births
1930 deaths
English cricketers
Northamptonshire cricketers
People from Hambleton District
Cricketers from Yorkshire